The Luxembourg national badminton team represents Luxembourg in international badminton team competitions. The national team trains under the Luxembourg Badminton Federation, which is headquartered in Kirchberg, Luxembourg City.

The Luxembourgish team competed in the Sudirman Cup seven consecutive times from 1997 to 2009 after the national team failed to qualify for the team event. The mixed team also made its debut in the European Mixed Team Badminton Championships in 2013. The men's team competed in the 2020 European Men's Team Badminton Championships but were eliminated in the group stages.

Participation in BWF competitions

Sudirman Cup

Participation in European Team Badminton Championships

Men's Team

Mixed Team

Participation in Helvetia Cup

Current squad 

Men
Robert Mann
Mattias Sonderskov
Kevin Hargiono
Leo Hölzmer
Yann Zaccaria
Yannick Feltes
Jerome Pauquet
Maxime Szturma
William Wang

Women
Kim Schmidt
Mara Hafner
Myriam Have
Zoé Sinico

References

Badminton
National badminton teams
Badminton in Luxembourg